Julah is a village in Tejakula District in the regency of Buleleng in north-eastern Bali, Indonesia. The village hit the national headlines in 2008 with a bizarre story about a cow which villagers from Julah believed was impregnated by a human and was drowned.

References

Populated places in Bali